Mahopac Central School District is a school district headquartered in Mahopac, New York.

History

Circa 2014 superintendent Thomas J. Manko left his position. The Mahopac school board selected Forest City Regional School District superintendent John Kopicki as the successor, but Kopicki chose not to take the position.

Anthony DiCarlo became the superintendent in 2018. He formerly served as a principal in the New Rochelle School District.

Schools
 Secondary
 Mahopac High School
 Mahopac Middle School
 Mahopac Falls Academy (alternative middle school)

 Primary
 Austin Road Elementary School
 Fulmar Road Elementary School
 Lakeview Elementary School

Scandals

2014 racism incident 
At a high school basketball game, Mahopac students and spectators were accused of verbally attacking basketball players from Mount Vernon, New York, with "racial taunts of an abhorrent nature." After eventually losing the game, Mahopac students then took to Twitter to continue the harassment, specifically focusing their attacks towards African-American students. Once word began to spread of the incident, students from other school districts began to support the statements made by Mount Vernon, citing similar issues with Mahopac students. Upon investigation, 3 Mahopac students were suspended. As a result of the incident, Mahopac's varsity basketball coach at the time, Kevin Downes, stepped down from his position.

2019 racism incident 
Similar to the incident in 2014, Mahopac High School junior varsity lacrosse players were accused of racist behaviors during a game against the team from New Rochelle, New York. A parent of a New Rochelle athlete reported that Mahopac athletes referred to the New Rochelle athletes as "[expletive] Mexicans" and that they refused to shake hands with African-American athletes. Mahopac's Superintendent, Anthony DiCarlo, immediately got in touch with New Rochelle administrators about the incident, responding to the accusations by stating, "We must be ever-vigilant when confronting behavior that runs counter to expected norms...Anyone found responsible will be held accountable in accordance with district policies and procedures." However, no reports of disciplinary actions came from the school district afterwards.

2019 mascot controversy 
In October 2019, Daniel Ehrenpreis, a 2012 Mahopac alumnus and Johns Hopkins University public health graduate, began a petition seeking to retire the Mahopac School District's "Indian" mascot. Current Mahopac High School students and alumni of subsequently signed in support. However, within days, a counter-petition circulated underscoring the significance of the mascot, originally selected to honor the Mahopac band of the Wappinger people native to the community.

After listening to arguments from both sides, the school district chose to keep the mascot, stating that they "determined that the Mahopac Indian was an appropriate symbol of pride, as it honored the Algonquin Indians who inhabited Mahopac long before any of us."

The matter was reopened in June 2020, after students again petitioned the school district to not only retire the mascot but also address ongoing racial issues prevalent in the schools. On June 18, several residents sought to express concerns pertaining to the school mascot during a virtual school board meeting. However, despite submitting questions before the deadline, the topic was never brought up by either school officials or board members.

District Superintendent Anthony DiCarlo subsequently posted a letter expressing the board's position:

"The Board appreciates the outreach, research, and advocacy that Mr. Ehrenpreis has conducted with regard to the issue of the District's mascot.

The District met with Mr. Ehrenpreis (via skype) in December 2019, listened to his concerns, and considered the facts and argument that he (and his colleagues) had advanced regarding their desire to change the mascot.

The District then conducted its own historical investigation into the origins of the mascot.

The first inhabitants of the land that is today Mahopac were members of the Algonquin people. In addition, the District had previously been advised by the town historian that descendants of the Algonquin people in fact appreciated and took great pride in the District using the nickname and did not want the District to abandon its use.

The District ultimately determined that it would, accordingly, maintain the mascot."

References

External links
 Mahopac Central School District

School districts in New York (state)
Education in Putnam County, New York